Lewiston Council may be:

Lewiston Council (Idaho)
Lewiston Council (Montana)